Abhira may refer to:

Abhira tribe, an ancient Indian tribe
Abhira Kingdom, an ancient kingdom ruled by the Abhira tribe
Abhira dynasty, a classical era Indian empire in South India
Ahir, a pastoralist community probably descended from the ancient Abhira tribe
Abhira-Gupta dynasty (Nepal), a 6th century kingdom in Nepal claiming descent from the Abhira tribe